The Nitro Nobel Gold Medal is an explosives industry award given by the Nitro Nobel Company of Sweden (now part of Dyno Nobel).

The medal is gold, and features the same obverse as the Nobel Prize, but a different reverse. The medal has sometimes been confused with the Nobel Prize.

The award has only been given three times since its creation in 1967. The recipients are:

 1967 — Dr. Robert W. Van Dolah, for the development of a theory he developed to explain the accidental initiation of liquid explosives
 1968 — Dr. Melvin A. Cook, for the discovery of slurry explosives
 1990 — Dr. Per-Anders Persson for the invention of the Nonel fuze.

See also

 List of engineering awards

References

Explosives engineering awards
Swedish awards